Open Season may refer to:

Time periods
 Open season (hunting), when hunting a particular species is legal
 Annual enrollment or open season, when employees may make changes to benefit programs

Film and television
 Open Season (1974 film), a British-Spanish film directed by Peter Collinson
 Open Season, a 1995 film featuring Robert Wuhl
 Open Season (film series), a series of animated films
 Open Season (2006 film), the first film in the series
 "Open Season" (Criminal Minds), a 2007 television episode

Literature
 Open Season (comics), a 1986–1989 comic book series by Jim Bricker
 Open Season, a 1992 Hardy Boys Casefiles novel
 Open Season Awards, offered by the Canadian literary quarterly The Malahat Review

Music
 The Open Season, a 2000s Australian rock band

Albums
 Open Season (British Sea Power album), 2005
 Open Season (Feist album), 2006
 Open Season, by Emerson Drive, 1996
 Open Season, by High Tide, 2000
 Open Season, by Stubborn All-Stars, 1995

Songs
 "Open Season (Une autre saison)", by Josef Salvat, 2015
 "Open Season", by Man Overboard from Heart Attack, 2013
 "Open Season", by Stuck Mojo from Southern Born Killers, 2007

Video games
 Open Season (video game), a 2006 game based on the 2006 film
 Police Quest: Open Season, a 1993 game